Alsap Butte is a  summit located in the Grand Canyon in Coconino County of northern Arizona, Southwestern United States. Its nearest higher neighbor is Brady Peak, one mile to the southwest, with Hancock Butte and Mount Hayden set to the northwest, and Colter Butte two miles to southeast. Alsap Butte is named after John T. Alsap, a pioneer and politician of the Arizona Territory who served as the first mayor of Phoenix, and is known as "Father of Maricopa County". The geographical feature's name was officially adopted in 1932 by the United States Board on Geographic Names. According to the Köppen climate classification system, Alsap Butte is located in a cold semi-arid climate zone. Alsap Butte is composed of Pennsylvanian-Permian Supai Group overlaying cliff-forming Mississippian Redwall Limestone, which in turn overlays slope-forming Cambrian Tonto Group. Precipitation runoff from this feature drains northeast into the Colorado River via Nankoweap Creek.

See also
 Geology of the Grand Canyon area

References

External links 

 Weather forecast: National Weather Service
 Alsap Butte photo by Harvey Butchart

Grand Canyon, North Rim
Grand Canyon
Landforms of Coconino County, Arizona
Buttes of Arizona
North American 2000 m summits
Colorado Plateau
Grand Canyon National Park